The Women's Triple Jump event at the 2000 Summer Olympics as part of the athletics program was held at the Olympic Stadium.

The top twelve athletes from the three jumps in qualifying progressed through to the final where the qualifying distances are scrapped and they start afresh with another three jumps. After these the top eight athletes carry their record forward and then have a further three attempts to decide the gold medalist.

Medalists

Schedule
All times are Australian Eastern Standard Time (UTC+10)

Records

Results
All distances shown are in meters.

 DNS denotes did not start.
 DNF denotes did not finish.
 DQ denotes disqualification.
 NR denotes national record.
 AR denotes area/continental record.
 OR denotes Olympic record.
 WR denotes world record.
 PB denotes personal best.
 SB denotes season best

Qualifying 
Held on Friday, September 22, 2000.

The qualifying distance was 14.25m. For all qualifiers who did not achieve the standard, the remaining spaces in the final were filled by the longest jumps until a total of 12 qualifiers.

Group A

Group B

Overall qualifying results

Final

References

External links
Official Report of the 2000 Sydney Summer Olympics
IAAF

Athletics at the 2000 Summer Olympics
Triple jump at the Olympics
2000 in women's athletics
Women's events at the 2000 Summer Olympics